Panama – South Korea relations are bilateral relations between Panama and South Korea, which were established in 1962. Panama has an embassy in Seoul. South Korea has an embassy in Panama City.

Both countries are members of the United Nations.

2010 was an important year for bilateral relations. In June, South Korean President Lee Myung-bak visited Panama. Later, in October, he received his Panamanian counterpart Ricardo Martinelli at Cheong Wa Dae for summit talks.

The Panama-Korea Association was established in 2012 with the purpose of promoting and strengthening commercial, academic, cultural and friendship links between both countries.

See also
 Foreign relations of Panama 
 Foreign relations of South Korea

References

 
South Korea
Panama